Geoffrey Moore (born 1946) is an American organizational theorist, management consultant and author, known for his work Crossing the Chasm: Marketing and Selling High-Tech Products to Mainstream Customers.

Biography 
Moore received a bachelor's degree in American literature from Stanford University (1967) and a doctorate in English literature from the University of Washington (1974).

Moore began his professional life as an English professor at Olivet College in Michigan, before moving his family to California, where he took a job as a corporate trainer and executive assistant at a technology company.

Prior to working with the McKenna Group, Moore was a sales and marketing executive at Rand Information Systems, Enhansys, and Mitem. He heads his own consulting firm, Geoffrey Moore Consulting, and is a venture partner with Mohr Davidow Ventures and Wildcat Venture Partners as well as managing director at Geoffrey Moore Consulting.

Books 
 Crossing the Chasm: Marketing and Selling High-tech Products to Mainstream Customers (1991, revised 1999 and 2014). 
 Inside the Tornado: Marketing Strategies from Silicon Valley's Cutting Edge (1995). .
 Inside the Tornado: Strategies for Developing, Leveraging, and Surviving Hypergrowth Markets (2004). Revised edition. 
 The Gorilla Game: An Investor's Guide to Picking Winners in High Technology (with Paul Johnson and Tom Kippola, 1998). .
 The Gorilla Game : Picking Winners in High Technology (1999). Revised edition. .
 Living on the Fault Line : Managing for Shareholder Value in the Age of the Internet (2000). .
 Living on the Fault Line, Revised Edition: Managing for Shareholder Value in Any Economy (2002). Revised edition. .
 Dealing with Darwin: How Great Companies Innovate at Every Phase of Their Evolution (2005). .
 Escape Velocity: Free Your Company's Future from the Pull of the Past (2011). .
 Zone to Win: Organizing to Compete in an Age of Disruption (2015). .
 The Infinite Staircase: What the Universe Tells Us About Life, Ethics, and Mortality (2021). .

References

External links 

 

1946 births
Living people
American business theorists
American business writers
Business speakers